Suzanne Alexandra Maria Reuter (born 14 June 1952) is a Swedish actress. She appeared in more than fifty films since 1978.

Filmography

Film

Television

Awards 

 Guldbagge Award for Best Actress in a Leading Role (1994)

References

External links 

 

1952 births
Swedish soap opera actresses
Actresses from Stockholm
Living people